May 24 - Eastern Orthodox Church calendar - May 26

All fixed commemorations below celebrated on June 7 by Orthodox Churches on the Old Calendar.

For May 25th, Orthodox Churches on the Old Calendar commemorate the Saints listed on May 12.

Feasts
 Third Finding of the Precious Head of Saint John the Baptist (c. 850)

Saints
 Martyrs Pasicrates, Valentinian, Julius and others at Dorostolum (302)
 Hieromartyr Therapont of Cyprus, bishop (300-305)
 Hieromartyrs Maximus and Victorinus (384)
 Saint Dodo, prince of Georgia, monk of Gareji (596)
 Saint Olbian (Albianos), monk.

Pre-Schism Western saints
 Hieromartyr Urban, Pope of Rome (230)
 Martyr Celestine, in Rome.
 Saint Dionysios (Dionysius Mariani, Denis), Bishop of Milan (359)
 Saint Zenobius, first Bishop of Florence (390)
 Saint Leo of Troyes, monk who succeeded St Romanus as Abbot of Mantenay near Troyes, France (c. 550)
 Saints Injuriosus and Scholastica, a married couple in the Auvergne in France who lived in virginity and holiness (c. 550)
 Saint Aldhelm, Bishop of Sherborne (709)
 Saint Dúnchad mac Cinn Fáelad (Dunchadh), the eleventh abbot of Iona (707–717) in Scotland (717)
 Hieromartyrs Gerbald, Reginhard, Winebald and Worad, of the monastery of St Bertin in France, all martyred by the Danes (862)
 Saint Egilhard, eighth abbot of Cornelimünster near Aachen in Germany, martyred by Vikings at Bercheim (881)
 Saint Gennadius of Astorga, Bishop of Astorga, later a hermit (936)

Post-Schism Orthodox saints
 Saint Skiota of Georgia (c. 13th century)
 Saint Dmitry, Price of Uglich, son of Andrey Vasilyevich (c. 1540)
 Saint Thekla of Pereyaslavl, nun, (mother of St. Daniel, Abbot of Pereyaslavl-Zalesski +1540) (16th century)
 Saint Innocent, Archbishop of Cherson and Taurica (1857)
 Synaxis of the Saints of Volhynia: 
Yaropolk, Stephen, Macarius, Igor and Juliana.

New martyrs and confessors
 Virgin-Martyr Helen Korobkova (1938)
 Hieromartyr Tavrion Tolokontsevo (1939)

Other commemorations
 Icon of the Mother of God "the Helper of the sinners" from Koretsk.
 Commemoration of the Reunion of 3,000,000 Uniates with the Orthodox Church at Vilnius in 1831 (1831)
 Repose of recluse George of Zadonsk (1836)
 Finding of the holy icon of Saint Demetrios the Myrrh-gusher, in Ermoupolis on the island of Syros, in the Cyclades, Greece (1936)
 Commemoration of Protopresbyter John Labunsky of Nizhyn (1945)

Icon gallery

Notes

References

Sources
 May 25/June 7. Orthodox Calendar (PRAVOSLAVIE.RU).
 June 7/May 25. HOLY TRINITY RUSSIAN ORTHODOX CHURCH (A parish of the Patriarchate of Moscow).
 Complete List of Saints. Protection of the Mother of God Church (POMOG).
 May 25. OCA - The Lives of the Saints.
 Dr. Alexander Roman. May. Calendar of Ukrainian Orthodox Saints (Ukrainian Orthodoxy - Українське Православ'я).
 May 25. Latin Saints of the Orthodox Patriarchate of Rome.
 May 25. The Roman Martyrology. 
Greek Sources
 Great Synaxaristes:  25 ΜΑΪΟΥ. ΜΕΓΑΣ ΣΥΝΑΞΑΡΙΣΤΗΣ.
  Συναξαριστής. 25 Μαΐου. ECCLESIA.GR. (H ΕΚΚΛΗΣΙΑ ΤΗΣ ΕΛΛΑΔΟΣ). 
Russian Sources
  7 июня (25 мая). Православная Энциклопедия под редакцией Патриарха Московского и всея Руси Кирилла (электронная версия). (Orthodox Encyclopedia - Pravenc.ru).
  25 мая (ст.ст.) 7 июня 2013 (нов. ст.). Русская Православная Церковь Отдел внешних церковных связей. (DECR).

May in the Eastern Orthodox calendar